Chryst is a surname. Notable people with the surname include:

Geep Chryst (born 1962), American football player and coach
George Chryst (1937–1992), American football player and coach
Keller Chryst, American football player
Paul Chryst (born 1965), American football player and coach
Rick Chryst, American sports commissioner